Farwell is an unincorporated community and census-designated place (CDP) in Clinton County, Pennsylvania, United States. It was first listed as a CDP prior to the 2020 census.

The CDP is in northern Clinton County, in the southwestern part of Chapman Township. It is bordered to the west by the borough of Renovo and to the northeast by the CDP of North Bend, and it sits on the north bank of the West Branch Susquehanna River.  Summerson Mountain rises  directly above Farwell to the northwest.

Pennsylvania Route 120 runs through Farwell, leading west through Renovo  to Sinnemahoning and southeastward through North Bend, the same distance to Lock Haven.

Demographics

References 

Census-designated places in Clinton County, Pennsylvania
Census-designated places in Pennsylvania